The Art of Picking Up Women is a 2005 EP by The Dix, a fictitious doo-wop group from the fictional town of Compton, New York, formed by Prince Paul, Mr. Len, Mr. Dead and Don Newkirk. A parody of 1950s/60s doo-wop, the album also has influences of funk, dancehall, downtempo and soul. The record is accompanied by a bonus DVD featuring a mockumentary about the history of the fictional band.

Track listing

References 

2005 debut EPs